Tiwanaku Municipality is the third municipal section of the Ingavi Province in the  La Paz Department, Bolivia. Its seat is the village of Tiwanaku located near the UNESCO World Heritage Site Tiwanaku.

Cantons 
The municipality is divided into three cantons. They are (their seats in parentheses):
 Huacullani - (Huacullani)
 Pillapi San Agustín - (Pillapi San Agustín)
 Tiwanaku - (Tiwanaku village)

The people 
The people are predominantly indigenous citizens of Aymara descent.

Some data:

Languages 
The languages spoken in the Tiwanaku Municipality are mainly Aymara and Spanish.

Tourist attractions 
Some of the tourist attractions of the municipality are:
 the archaeological site of Tiwanaku in the Tiwanaku Canton
 Saint Peter church in Tiwanaku
 Willkakuti, the Andean-Amazonic New Year, celebrated on June 21 of every year in the viewpoint of Kimsa Chata mountain in the Tiwanaku Canton
 Tiwanaku festivity (Señor de la Exaltación) celebrated in the Tiwanaku Canton in September

See also 
 Chuqi Ch'iwani
 Ch'alla Jawira
 Laqaya
 Nasa Puqi
 Qaluyu
 Tiwanaku River
 Wila Qullu

References 

 www.ine.gov.bo / census 2001: Tiwanaku Municipality

External links 
 Tiwanaku Municipality: population data and map (Spanish)

Municipalities of La Paz Department (Bolivia)